Goniodoma limoniella is a moth of the family Coleophoridae. It is found in western Europe (the coastal salt marshes of Great Britain, the Netherlands, Belgium and France) and the Mediterranean region (including the coast of Tunisia).

The wingspan is about 10 mm. Adults are on wing from July to August.

The eggs are laid on the flower of Limonium vulgare and the larvae feed on the seeds. They build a case out of the excised calyx. Full-grown larvae bore into the stem of the host plant and overwinter. Larvae can be found from September to May.

References

Coleophoridae
Moths described in 1884
Moths of Africa
Moths of Europe
Taxa named by Henry Tibbats Stainton